The bicolored trailing ant or flower ant (Monomorium floricola) is a species of ant of the subfamily Myrmicinae. It is a widespread, invasive ant which is found all over the world.

References

External links

 at antwiki.org
Animaldiversity.org
Landcare Research 

floricola
Hymenoptera of Asia
Insects described in 1851